Two human polls make up the 2022–23 NCAA Division I men's ice hockey rankings, the USCHO.com/CBS College Sports poll and the USA Today/USA Hockey Magazine poll. As the 2022–23 season progresses, rankings are updated weekly.

Legend

USCHO

USA Today

References

2021–22 NCAA Division I men's ice hockey season
College men's ice hockey rankings in the United States